Dipsas nicholsi is a non-venomous snake found in Panama.

References

Dipsas
Snakes of North America]
Endemic fauna of Panama
Reptiles of Panama
Reptiles described in 1933
Taxa named by Emmett Reid Dunn